Freedom Suite is an album by jazz saxophonist Sonny Rollins, his last recorded for the Riverside label, featuring performances by Rollins with Oscar Pettiford and Max Roach.

Reception

The Allmusic review by Scott Yanow states: "Rollins is very creative, stretching out on his lengthy 'Freedom Suite,' clearly enjoying investigating the obscure Noël Coward melody 'Someday I'll Find You,' turning the show tune 'Till There Was You' into jazz, and finding beauty in 'Shadow Waltz' and 'Will You Still Be Mine?' A near masterpiece."

Track listing
 "The Freedom Suite" (Sonny Rollins) - 19:17
 "Someday I'll Find You" (Noël Coward) - 4:35
 "Will You Still Be Mine?" (Tom Adair, Matt Dennis) - 2:54
 "Till There Was You" (Meredith Willson) - 4:54
 "Till There Was You" [alternate take] (Willson) - 4:55 Bonus track on CD rerelease
 "Shadow Waltz" (Al Dubin, Harry Warren) - 4:08
Recorded at WOR Recording Studio, NYC, on February 11 (tracks 2-6), and March 7 (track 1), 1958

Personnel
Sonny Rollins – tenor saxophone
Oscar Pettiford - bass
Max Roach - drums

References

1958 albums
Riverside Records albums
Jazzland Records (1960) albums
Sonny Rollins albums
albums produced by Orrin Keepnews